HNLMS Dolfijn (Dutch: Dolphin) was a  of the Royal Netherlands Navy.

Ship history
The submarine was laid down on 30 December 1954 at the Rotterdamse Droogdok Mij shipyard in Rotterdam and launched on 20 May 1959. 16 December 1960 she was commissioned in the Dutch navy.

In March 1962 the boat and Zeeleeuw where send to the west coast of the US to show the flag. After this Dolfijn, Zeeleeuw and a number of destroyers were sent to Netherlands New Guinea because of rising tension between the Netherlands and Indonesia. When the situation calmed down, she returned to the Netherlands.
In 1963 Toulouse was visited for testing of a new type of torpedo tube. In May 1964 Dolfijn participated in an exercise called Long Look held between Canada and Greenland.
In January 1968 Dolfijn and  left the port of Den Helder for a war simulation in the northern Atlantic Ocean that would last 5 weeks.

In May 1970 an international exercise called Rusty Nut is held where the boat participated in. Later that year in September she participated in the NATO exercise Northern Wedding.
In early 1971 she practiced with her sister  in the Bay of Biscay.
In September 1976 she participated in the NATO exercise Team Work.
In July 1978 Dolfijn, Zeehond,  Potvis and  practiced firing exercises.

On 29 April 1982 the boat was decommissioned. On 22 July 1985 the boat was sold to be scrapped at the yard of the Heuvelman in Puttershoek.

Captain Just Roele was one of the Commanders of this submarine and enjoys the honour of being the first Dutch submarine commander to take a Dutch submarine around the World. Captain Roele later took overall command of the Dutch Submarine fleet and subsequently became Dutch Defence Attache in London and New York.

References

1959 ships
Ships built in Rotterdam
Dolfijn-class submarines
Submarines built by Rotterdamsche Droogdok Maatschappij